Opuntia dillenii is a species of prickly pear native to the tropical and subtropical Americas. It is naturalized in many other parts of the world. It differs from O. stricta by having more spines per areole (usually more than 3).

References 

dillenii